Krister Mähönen (born January 30, 1992) is a Finnish ice hockey player. His is currently playing with HC TPS in the Finnish SM-liiga.

Mahonen made his SM-liiga debut playing with HC TPS during the 2012–13 SM-liiga season.

References

External links

1992 births
Living people
Finnish ice hockey forwards
HC TPS players